The Iran men's national 3x3 team is the 3x3 basketball team representing Iran in international men's competitions.

The team won the bronze medal in the men's tournament at the 2018 Asian Games held in Jakarta, Indonesia.

References

 
Basketball
Men's national 3x3 basketball teams